The spotlight operator or followspot operator is a theatrical technician who operates a specialized stage lighting instrument known as a followspot. A followspot is any lighting instrument manually controlled by an operator during a performance. Generally a followspot will be a dedicated, large lighting instrument designed to pan and change size, beam width, and color easily by hand.

Followspot controls
Choppers – Cuts or shutters the top and bottom part of the beam.
Douser – Controls intensity.
Iris – Controls beam size.
Trombone – Controls focal length.
Color frames – Changes the color of the light. May also know as a boomerang or a color magazine. Color magazines contain the color gels, which are counted from the rear of the follow spot forward.

Cueing
The way the lead follow-spotter will cue you is by saying "Spot(s) 2 (and 3) on [actor/actress](s) in a frame 2 (sometimes it's more than one color at once) with a half douser." It may seem confusing at first, but usually you will have a cue sheet in front of you, so you know your cues, and you get them right. Getting the cues right is one thing, but making sure you aim and shoot the follow spot in the right place is key, too.

Positioning and cueing
In professional theatre, auditoriums, arenas, amphitheaters, colosseums, convention centers, performing arts centers, and community and school theaters, spot ops may use a special tool called a Telrad. A Telrad is a cue alignment tool that came from a telescope's finderscope. This tool device helps the operator to align the follow spot, before any light leaves the follow spot (with the dowser closed in a pre-cue position) or for location reference during stage shots where the spotlight might become hard to see due to overall illumination of the stage, or when two spotlights are overlapping their respective assigned subjects. The operator, when looking through a Telrad, will see multiple red ring circles (which can be dimmed to assist in low level lighting); this assists in aiming the follow spot. Especially for tight pickup cues where there is a high need for precision, with little stray light spilling over and onto the surrounding environment. Often, times the placement location's distance and alignment of the Telrad's housing unit on the spotlight, in relation to the operator's eyes, will allow the rings to help align with the standard sizes of headshot, half body, full body shot. The spotlight operator is able to use the device with both eyes open due to the Bindon aiming concept which the brain can impose the red reticle into the combined vision from both eyes. Prior to usage and availability of these red dot sight style devices, various methods were and are still used. Such as using a small piece of pipe to visually limit the area seen to small area or making homemade out of various stiff wire (sometimes spent carbon rods from use in Carbon-Arc older Follow Spotlights) to create a crosshair style sights, similar to ones seen on early anti-aircraft guns. There were also sets of magnets, and various other items attached, used to create a sight pattern to assist in aligning the spot light. Another earlier method and still in use is to use a dry erase board, Sheets of paper placed on the wall, colored or white electrical (or gaffer's) tape , that are then have the light leak shape drawn upon them with a label. Making the original outline, traces of the light leaks when the spotlight was in the correct position and was set up during rehearsals. Which the placement of these marks are located behind or above the rear of the spotlight to use. During normal operation these small amounts of light that escape the follow spot housing, moving as the rear's position changes in reference to the front lenses, which the audience does not see, nor are distracted by them. When the small light leak is aligned inside their cue marks on the board, paper, or tape, the spotlight would be in the predetermined position aligned relative to the pick up position. Allowing operator to pick up their intended cue more preciously, without having to ghost on (to slightly open the dowser to see the light on stage to confirm position, which can be disrupting to the audience or illuminate the stage when in blackout). These options aid the spotlight operator in finding their cue marks from distances far away from the stage. The usage of aiming devices for precision is used more in theatre style shows than in various musical concerts in arenas, amphitheaters, coliseums, etc. The various distances of spot light location set up positioning based on the venue's size and the spot locations may also affect the need for devices to assist in aiming.

See also
 Stage lighting
 Stage lighting instrument
 Light board operator
 Deck electrician
 Super Trouper

Theatrical occupations
Stage lighting
Television terminology
Mass media occupations
Broadcasting occupations